Byglandsfjord is a village in Bygland municipality in Agder county, Norway. The village is located in the Setesdal valley along the Norwegian National Road 9 and the river Otra in the far southern part of the municipality, just north of the border with Evje og Hornnes municipality and at the southern end of the lake Byglandsfjorden. Revsnes Hotel offers accommodation.

Byglandsfjord Station, the terminal station of the now defunct Setesdal Line was also located in this village.

The steamboat  (1866) travels on the Byglandsfjorden between the villages of Byglandsfjord, Bygland, and Ose during the summer months. The wood-fired steamboat was the former most important transport across the lake, before further transport by horse and carriage up the valley.

Notable residents
Kjell Kristian Rike (1944–2008), a Norwegian sports commentator

References

Bygland
Setesdal
Villages in Agder